The SET50 and SET100 Indices are the primary stock indices of Thailand.  The constituents of both lists are companies listed on the Stock Exchange of Thailand (SET) in Bangkok.

Calculation
The SET50 Index and the SET100 Index were created "to accommodate the issuing of index futures and options in the future, and to provide a benchmark of investment in the Stock Exchange of Thailand [SET]". Both indices are calculated from the stock prices of companies that are included in the SET Index, but each index consists of a subset of those stocks by a ranking based on large market capitalization, high liquidity and compliance with requirements regarding the distribution of shares to minor shareholders: those stocks ranked as the top 50 such stocks are the component stocks of the SET50 Index and those ranked as the top 100 — which also includes the top 50 — are the component stocks of the SET100 Index.

The calculation method used for these two indices is the same as that used for the SET Index, which is a market capitalization weighted index. The base dates used are 16 August 16, 1995 (SET50 Index) and 30 April 2005 (SET100 Index), which are the respective dates that the two indices were first published and were set to a base value of 1000 points. The base market value is continually adjusted to correspond to changes in the market values of the underlying securities of each index.

Stock revision

The list of component stocks in the SET50 Index and the SET100 Index are revised every six months in order to adjust for any unexpected changes that have occurred in the stock market such as new listings or public offerings. After these adjustments are made, stocks that meet the necessary qualifications are then selected to become part of the SET50 Index or the SET100 Index. Stock selection is conducted semi-annually between December 1–31 and June 1–30. During these two periods, The Stock Exchange of Thailand will select stocks based on its pre-stipulated criteria.
The revised stock lists for both the SET50 and the SET100 will be announced to the general public as soon as the lists become available. New SET100 and SET50 Indices will take effect on the first trading day in January and July of each year. For every revision, both Index calculations will treat stocks which have been withdrawn as a delisting case and stocks which have been added as a new listing case. Whenever a stock is removed from either or both of the indices, a new stock will be added to replace it and to ensure the uninterruption of the indices. Also, adjustments will be made whenever the market value of a component stock changes due to the conversion of convertible bonds, the exercising of warrants, or new shares are issued for capital increase of the component stock, etc.

Constituents 

Constituent companies of the SET50 stock index, as of 2023:

See also
 Stock index
 Thailand Futures Exchange (TFEX): SET50 Index Futures

References

External links
Bloomberg page for SET50:IND
Stock Exchange of Thailand
Detailed list of the SET50 companies with description, logo and link to their websites on ASEAN UP Top 50 companies from Thailand’s SET50

Stock Exchange of Thailand
Thai stock market indices